The 2018–19 Mississippi State Bulldogs women's basketball team represented Mississippi State University during the 2018–19 NCAA Division I women's basketball season. The Bulldogs, led by seventh-year head coach Vic Schaefer, played their home games at Humphrey Coliseum as members of the Southeastern Conference (SEC).

The Bulldogs are coming off a runner-up finish to Notre Dame for the national championship in which they lost 58–61.

Roster

Rankings

^Coaches' Poll did not release a second poll at the same time as the AP.

Schedule

|-
!colspan=9 style=| Exhibition

|-
!colspan=12 style=| Non-conference regular season

|-
!colspan=9 style=| SEC regular season

|-
!colspan=9 style=| SEC Women's Tournament

|-
!colspan=9 style=| NCAA Women's Tournament

See also
 2018–19 Mississippi State Bulldogs men's basketball team

References

Mississippi State Bulldogs women's basketball seasons
Mississippi State
Mississippi State Bulldogs women's
Mississippi State Bulldogs women's
Mississippi State